Mangina is a genus of tiger moths in the family Erebidae.

Species
 Mangina argus (Kollar, [1847])
 Mangina syringa (Cramer, 1775)
 Mangina pulchra (Swinhoe, 1892)

References
Dubatolov, V.V. (2010). Tiger-moths of Eurasia (Lepidoptera, Arctiidae) (Nyctemerini by Rob de Vos & Vladimir V. Dubatolov). Neue Entomologische Nachrichten. Marktleuthen. 65: 1-106.
Kaleka, A.S. & Kirti J.S. (2001) A new genus Mangina along with the taxonomy of Argina Hubner (Arctiinae: Arctiidae: Lepidoptera). Journal of the Bombay Natural History Society 98 (2): 250-253.
Natural History Museum Lepidoptera generic names catalog

Nyctemerina
Moth genera